Palmer is a town just east of the Adelaide Hills region of South Australia along the Adelaide-Mannum Road, 70 kilometres east-north-east of the state capital, Adelaide and 15 km west-north-west of Mannum. It is located in the Mid Murray Council local government area. At the 2006 census, Palmer had a population of 329.

Palmer has a primary school (opened 1882), a general store, hotel and a Lutheran Church
of which Carl Heinrich Loessel was the first pastor, from 22 May 1869 before the church was built, succeeded by the long-serving Pastor Kuss.

At the ABS 2001 census, Palmer had a population of 305 people living in 124 dwellings.

There are some rock formations at the Granite Boulders Area Geological Site.

History
Palmer is sited on the western confines of the Indigenous Ngaralta people. The first European explorers through the Palmer district were Dr George Imlay and John Hill in January 1838.

The Reedy Creek special survey was granted on 14 September 1846 to Enthoven, Capper and Masterman with Samuel Davenport as agent. The township of Palmer was laid out in August 1873 on section 960. The town was named after Colonel George Palmer, a South Australian Colonisation Commissioner. It was settled as a mining and agricultural settlement. The Kitticoola mine was discovered as a copper and gold deposit in 1845. The remaining surface elements of the underground mine are heritage-listed. Hillgrove Resources acquired rights for further mineral exploration in 2014.

Heritage listings

Palmer has a number of heritage-listed sites, including:

 Adelaide-Mannum Road: Granite Boulders Area Geological Site
 Mannum Road: Palmer Police Station and Cells
 off Mine Road: Kitticoola Mine
 Palmer Road: Homestead Complex
 off Western Boundary Road: Reedy Creek Railway Bridge

References

External links
 Map of Palmer (Mid Murray Council)

Towns in South Australia